Sacalin Island is a newly formed island in the Black Sea, right off the coast of the Romanian Danube Delta, off the Sfântu Gheorghe branch. Initially Sacalin was made up of two smaller islands, Sacalinu Mare (Greater Sacalin) and Sacalinu Mic (Lesser Sacalin). In time, however, the two merged into one continuous landmass. The Romanian government has declared the area an ecological reserve and no settlement is permitted on the island.

References

Uninhabited islands of Romania
Islands of the Black Sea